Cyclamen balearicum, the Majorca or Balearic cyclamen, St. Peter's violet or sowbread, is a perennial plant growing from a tuber, native to shady areas in woodland of short evergreen trees and shrubs (holm oak, Kermes oak, box) up to  above sea level in the Balearic Islands and in isolated locations in France from the Pyrenees to the Rhone valley.

The flowers bloom in spring, are fragrant, and have five upswept white petals. The leaves are arrowhead-shaped and blue-green mottled with silver, with less sharply defined variegation than other cyclamens.

References

External links

Cyclamen Society
Pacific Bulb Society
Virtual Herbarium of the Western Mediterranean
Photos of leaves from trip to Majorca — Midland Alpine Gardener's Diary (middle of page)
White flowers page — Flora of Mallorca
Photo — TrekNature
Photo — BioLib
Photo — PBase
Photos — Mallorca es así también (Spanish)
Mark Griffiths Cyclamen species cultivation and photos site

balearicum